Chrysoritis aridus, the Namaqua opal, is a butterfly of the family Lycaenidae. It is found in South Africa, where it is found in Succulent Karoo in the Northern Cape.

The wingspan is 22–26 mm for males and 28–34 mm for females. Adults are on year from September to November. There is one generation per year.

The larvae feed on Chrysanthemoides incana and Zygophyllum species. The associated ant is unknown, but is suspected to be a Crematogaster species.

References

Butterflies described in 1953
Chrysoritis
Endemic butterflies of South Africa